Carlos Antonio Ponce Diaz (born February 7, 1959) is a Puerto Rican former professional baseball first baseman who is currently coach for the Wei Chuan Dragons of the Chinese Professional Baseball League (CPBL).

Career
He signed with the Milwaukee Brewers of Major League Baseball (MLB) as a free agent in 1982 and played with the team at the Major League level in 1985.

From 1986–1990, Ponce played with the Yokohama Taiyo Whales of the Nippon Professional Baseball (NPB). He had a .296 career average and a .555 slugging percentage, belting 119 home runs and compiling 389 runs batted in.

References

1959 births
Living people
Baseball players at the 1979 Pan American Games
Burlington Bees players
Butte Copper Kings players
El Paso Diablos players
Major League Baseball first basemen
Major League Baseball players from Puerto Rico
Milwaukee Brewers players
Nippon Professional Baseball first basemen
Nippon Professional Baseball outfielders
Nippon Professional Baseball third basemen
Pan American Games bronze medalists for Puerto Rico
Pan American Games medalists in baseball
Puerto Rican expatriate baseball players in Canada
Puerto Rican expatriate baseball players in Japan
Sportspeople from San Juan, Puerto Rico
Stockton Ports players
Vancouver Canadians players
Yokohama Taiyō Whales players
Medalists at the 1979 Pan American Games
Puerto Rican expatriate baseball people in Taiwan